Matt Austin (born Matthew Sadowski; 20 April 1978) is a Canadian actor, best known for his role as Bridge Carson, the Green Ranger (later Blue Ranger then Red) from the children's television series Power Rangers S.P.D.. He returned in 2007 as the Red Ranger in the Power Rangers Operation Overdrive "Once a Ranger" 15th anniversary team-up two-part episode. In addition to acting, he is also a writer, musician, and filmmaker.

Life and career
Austin communicates frequently with the Power Rangers fanbase, and was a guest at Power Morphicon in June 2007, where he interviewed guests and shot footage of the interviews with his own camera. Recently, he revealed plans to make a documentary on the Power Rangers fandom called MOR-FAN-ONIMAL. However, according to his Twitter account, production has ceased due to the funding not being put together.

Austin's "Power Rangers" character, Bridge, displays a particular fondness for buttered toast by wiggling the fingers on his right hand and uttering the word "buttery" as he does so. This reference stems from Austin's own fondness for Indian butter chicken. His character also wears gloves on his hands due to his inability to control his powers, though in reality, the gloves are used to conceal the tattoo that Matt has on his hands

Canada's Alliance Releasing has picked up worldwide rights to Don't You Forget About Me, a 75-minute documentary centered on late filmmaker John Hughes starring and directed by Austin. It chronicles Austin's recent road trip to the suburbs of Illinois, where he attempted to track down Hughes, who at that point had not written or directed a movie in more than a decade. The project features interviews with Ally Sheedy, Judd Nelson, Mia Sara, Kelly Le Brock and Andrew McCarthy.

Austin was born in Toronto, Ontario, Canada. He is Jewish.

Austin recently returned to acting after 13 years, starring in the comedy F'ED, by writer/director Tyler Boyco.

Filmography

References

External links
 
 

1978 births
20th-century Canadian male actors
21st-century Canadian male actors
Film producers from Ontario
Canadian male film actors
Canadian male television actors
Canadian people of Jewish descent
21st-century Canadian screenwriters
Film directors from Toronto
Jewish Canadian male actors
Living people
Male actors from Toronto
Musicians from Toronto
Writers from Toronto
21st-century Canadian male singers
Jewish Canadian filmmakers
Canadian male screenwriters